Ferrante Imperato (1525?  – 1615?), an apothecary of Naples, published Dell'Historia Naturale (Naples 1599) and illustrated it with his own cabinet of curiosities displayed at Palazzo Gravina in Naples; the engraving became the first pictorial representation of a Renaissance humanist's displayed natural history research collection. The collection, which the published catalogue made as famous in the seventeenth century as that of that other famous apothecary and virtuoso, Francesco Calceolari of Verona, ranged widely; it embraced a herbarium, shells, birds, sea creatures, in addition to the fossils, clays, minerals and metallic ores, marble and gem species. It was maintained by his son Francesco, who assisted him in writing up his observations, and who may be seen in the engraving pointing out details of the specimens to two visitors as Ferrante looks on.

Ferrante Imperato, who ranged southern Italy making geological observations, took as his motto In dies auctior. He was in correspondence with a network of scholars in Italy. He was among the first correctly to identify the processes through which fossils were formed, subjecting them to empirical tests. His pupil, schooled in the collection, was the jurist Fabio Colonna (1567–1640) who carried further his work on fossils. Ferrante had a small garden and corresponded with botanists, but historians of botany discount his interest in plants as "curiosa".

The book was so sought after that a second edition was issued in Venice, 1672, edited by Giovanni Maria Ferro, who added new material and new illustrations to the concluding chapter.

The catalogue is presented in twenty-eight books, which include nine books devoted to alchemy, a wholly reputable science at the time, which towards the end of the following century would give birth to chemistry. Other books are devoted to mining, animals and plant specimens.

Commentary on Imperato
Charles Lyell wrote the following in Principles of geology, Vol.1 (1830), pp. 26-27.
Cesalpino, a celebrated botanist, conceived that fossil shells had been left on the land by the retiring sea, and had concreted into stone during the consolidation the soil; and in the following year (1597), Simeone Majoli went still farther, and, coinciding for the most part with the views of Cesalpino, suggested that the shells and submarine matter of the Veronese, and other districts, might have been cast up, upon the land, by volcanic explosions, like those which gave rise, in 1588, to Monte Nuovo, near Puzzuoli. This hint was the first imperfect attempt to connect the position fossil shells with the agency of volcanoes, a system more fully developed by Hooke, Lazzaro Moro, Hutton, and other writers.

Two years afterwards, Imperati advocated the animal origin of fossilized shells, yet admitted that stones could vegetate by force of "an internal principle;" and, as evidence of this, he referred to the teeth of fish, and spines of echini found petrified.

Legacy
The Plantae genus Imperata is named after Ferrante Imperato.

Further reading
Wilson, Wendell E, "Ferrante Imperato (1550–1625). (The History of Mineral Collecting: 1530–1799)" The Mineralogical Record November 1994.

Notes

External link

Italian Renaissance humanists
Italian naturalists
16th-century births
1625 deaths
16th-century Italian scientists